P. pentaphylla may refer to:

 Pedicellaria pentaphylla, an annual wildflower
 Pinus pentaphylla, a white pine
 Potentilla pentaphylla, a wild strawberry